Antonio Bells (born 6 July 1948) is a Palauan politician who served as the Vice President of Palau and Minister of Justice between 17 January 2013 and 19 January 2017.

He graduated from Montana University with a degree in economics. He is a former delegate to the House of Delegates of Palau from the state of Ngaraard, since the 1996 elections. He served twice as the speaker of the House of Delegates, from April 2004 to November 2004, and from April 2007 to November 2008.

References

Living people
1948 births
Place of birth missing (living people)
Vice presidents of Palau
Government ministers of Palau
Speakers of the House of Delegates of Palau
People from Ngaraard
Justice Ministers of Palau
21st-century Palauan politicians